The Jimmy Giuffre Clarinet is an album by American jazz composer and arranger Jimmy Giuffre featuring him exclusively on clarinet which was released on the Atlantic label in 1956.

Reception

Scott Yanow of Allmusic states: "This continually interesting set finds Jimmy Giuffre sticking exclusively to his cool-toned clarinet, mostly playing in the lower register, in several settings. The thought-provoking and generally relaxed works feature a wide variety of instrumentation".

Track listing 
All compositions by Jimmy Giuffre except as indicated
 "So Low" - 2:48
 "Deep Purple" (Peter DeRose, Mitchell Parish) - 4:38
 "The Side Pipers" - 5:07
 "My Funny Valentine" (Richard Rodgers, Lorenz Hart) - 5:03
 "Quiet Cook" - 4:18
 "The Sheepherder" - 5:23
 "Fascinating Rhythm" (George Gershwin, Ira Gershwin) - 4:04
 "Down Home" - 5:40 
Recorded at Capitol Studios in Los Angeles, CA on March 21, 1956 (tracks 1, 4, 5 & 8) and March 22, 1956 (tracks 2, 3, 6 & 7)

Personnel 
Jimmy Giuffre - clarinet
Bud Shank - alto flute (track 3)
Buddy Collette - alto clarinet, flute (tracks 3 & 6)
Harry Klee - bass clarinet, bass flute (tracks 3 & 6)
Harry Edison, Shorty Rogers, Jack Sheldon - trumpet (track 8)
Bob Cooper - tenor saxophone, oboe (tracks 4 & 8)
Dave Pell - tenor saxophone, English horn (tracks 4 & 8)
Marty Berman - baritone saxophone, bassoon (tracks 4 & 8)
Jimmy Rowles - piano, celeste (tracks 2 & 7)
Ralph Peña - bass (tracks 4, 5 & 8)
Stan Levey (tracks 5 & 8), Shelly Manne (tracks 3 & 7) - drums

References 

Jimmy Giuffre albums
1956 albums
Atlantic Records albums
Albums produced by Nesuhi Ertegun